Brian Jeffrey Mihalik (born August 21, 1992) is a former American football offensive tackle. He played college football at Boston College and was drafted in the seventh round (237th overall) of the 2015 NFL Draft by the Philadelphia Eagles. Mihalik has also been a member of the Pittsburgh Steelers, Detroit Lions and New York Giants of the National Football League (NFL).

College career
In his freshman season in 2011, Mihalik had six tackles and two pass breakups, playing the last nine games of the season. He played nine games as a sophomore in 2012, registering 22 tackles, 3.5 tackles for loss, and a sack. As a junior in 2013, he recorded 22 tackles, including six for loss and two sacks. In his 2014 senior season, Mihalik tallied 27 tackles, including 4.5 tackles for a loss, and 3.5 sacks.

Professional career

Pre-draft
Mihalik was projected to go undrafted during the 2015 NFL Draft by some analysts. Although he had amazing size and length, many were hampered by his athletic ability, strength, and awareness.

Philadelphia Eagles
Mihalik was drafted by the Philadelphia Eagles in the seventh round of the 2015 NFL Draft with the 237th overall pick. Mihalik was signed to the practice squad after failing to make the 53-man roster, but was released on September 16.

Pittsburgh Steelers
After being released, Mihalik was signed to a futures contract by the Pittsburgh Steelers on January 20, 2016. Despite spending his collegiate career as a defensive end and having no prior experience, the Steelers chose to move him to offensive tackle. He is similar to Steelers' teammate Alejandro Villanueva, who had success after moving to tackle the year prior. Both players stand at 6 feet 9 inches, played defensive end for the Eagles before being released, had no professional experience as offensive linemen before being switched to tackle by offensive line coach Mike Munchak. On August 12, 2016, Mihalik injured his MCL during the Steeler's preseason opener against the Detroit Lions. He was waived two days later and reached an injury settlement with the Steelers on August 19, 2016.

Detroit Lions
On October 6, 2016, Mihalik was signed by the Detroit Lions and was released two days later and was then signed to the practice squad. The Detroit Lions signed him after seeing him during their preseason game against the Pittsburgh Steelers.

Pittsburgh Steelers (second stint)
October 17, 2016, the Pittsburgh Steelers signed Mihalik off the Lions' practice squad. Although he had less than a year of experience as an offensive tackle, injuries to Ryan Harris and Marcus Gilbert led to Mihalik moving to the active roster. Mihalik did not appear in any regular season games during his rookie season.

On September 2, 2017, Mihalik was waived by the Steelers.

Detroit Lions (second stint)
On September 3, 2017, Mihalik was claimed off waivers by the Lions. He was named the backup left tackle behind Greg Robinson to begin the regular season. Mihalik had his first professional catch on November 6, 2017 on Monday Night Football against the Green Bay Packers when a Matthew Stafford pass was tipped at the line and was hauled in by Mihalik.

On September 2, 2018, Mihalik was waived by the Lions.

New York Giants
On September 13, 2018, Mihalik was signed to the New York Giants' practice squad. He was promoted to the active roster on October 9, 2018.

On September 1, 2019, Mihalik was released by the Giants.

References

External links
 Boston College Eagles bio

1992 births
Living people
American football offensive tackles
Boston College Eagles football players
Detroit Lions players
New York Giants players
People from Avon Lake, Ohio
Philadelphia Eagles players
Pittsburgh Steelers players
Players of American football from Ohio
Sportspeople from Greater Cleveland